Wurrumiyanga, formerly Nguiu, is a community on the southern coast of Bathurst Island, Northern Territory, Australia.

Nguiu was founded in 1911 as a Catholic mission by Francis Xavier Gsell.

In 2010 Nguiu was renamed Wurrumiyanga, meaning the place where the cycads grow, by the Tiwi Land Council.

Nguiu Post Office opened on 3 June 1974 as the first office on Bathurst Island.

There are two Catholic schools in the town; Murrupurtiyanuwu Catholic Primary School, and Xavier Catholic College (Years 7-13).

Wurrumiyanga (Nguiu) is the home of Tiwi Designs, an art corporation (involving some 100 indigenous artists) which produces fabric, carvings, ceramics, print and paintings and whose aim is to promote, preserve and enrich Tiwi culture.

It is also home of the ground where Australian rules football is played and Tiwi Islands Football League matches.

References

Towns in the Northern Territory
Tiwi Islands
Aboriginal communities in the Northern Territory
Catholic Church in the Northern Territory
Australian Aboriginal missions